A black dwarf is a theoretical astronomical object.

Black Dwarf may refer to:

The Black Dwarf (novel), Walter Scott's 1816 book in the Tales of my Landlord, 1st series
The Black Dwarf (personage), David Ritchie (1740–1811), a Scottish dwarf and the basis for the title character in Sir Walter Scott's novel
The Black Dwarf, Thomas Jonathan Wooler's satirical 19th century Radical journal
The Black Dwarf (newspaper), a left-wing British journal of the 1960s, edited by Tariq Ali
"Black Dwarf", a song by the Swedish doom metal band Candlemass on their album Candlemass
Black Dwarf (comics), a fictional character in the Marvel Universe